Conus adversarius is an extinct species of venomous sea snail in the genus Conus. It lived from the Early Pliocene until the Early Pleistocene. It is the only species in the genus that is entirely sinistral (left handed). 

Initially described by T. A. Conrad in 1840 in Duplin County, North Carolina. The species is present in formations from south Florida to Virginia. It occupied a multitude of different marine ecosystems, which include reefs and deep sea environments.

Name 
The species name “adversarius” is a Latin word that means “against” or “opposed to”. This name is likely in reference to the sinistral nature of the species, which sets it apart from other species in the genus.

Discovery 
The first specimen of Conus adversarius was collected by Professor Mitchell of Chapel Hill, North Carolina. It was found in (what is termed by Conrad) as the “Medial tertiary” of Duplin County. Some time afterwards, it (and some other fossils) came into the possession of an individual by the name of Daniel B. Smith. Daniel was a friend of T. A. Conrad who was the first to recognize the importance of the fossils.

The species was first described in 1840, on page 388 of the American Journal of Science and Art, vol 39. Conrad had written to the editors of the journal that he had acquired some fossil shells of species that he believed to be new, and had given the descriptions of each to be published.

Description 

Conus adversarius can be almost immediately distinguished from all other Conidae species due to the sinistral nature of its shell. It is also the largest fossil cone in the south-eastern United States: specimens from Florida are known to 27 cm.

Ecology 

Habitat

Conus adversarius occupied a variety of habitats around the southeastern United States. These include reefs, open-marine environments, the deep sea, coastal waters, restricted shallow subtidal and offshore environments. The mean annual temperature analyzed between 3 specimens recorded from the Tamiami formation (pinecrest beds) was 24.9, 22.67 and 23.3°C.

Life span

Research into the same 3 specimens has shown the largest and smallest both lived the same amount of time, 2 years each.

Predators

Natural predators of Conus adversarius included Crabs and Moon snails, as evidenced by damage to their shells. Due to the venomous nature of the genus, the species wouldn’t have had many real predators.

Prey

Juvenile and adult Conus adversarius would have featured differing diets, which would change with age. As with modern cones, they would’ve used a harpoon-like organ to stun prey, before dragging them back to the snail for consumption. Juveniles would’ve eaten small sea worms, whilst the larger adults would’ve fed on fish and other snails.

References 

 A. A. Olsson and A. Harbison. 1953. Pliocene Mollusca of Southern Florida. Academy of Natural Sciences of Philadelphia Monograph 8:1-457
 J. R. DuBar. 1958. Stratigraphy and paleontology of the Late Neogene strata of the Caloosahatchee River area of southern Florida. Florida Geological Survey Bulletin 40:1-267
 A. A. Olsson and R. E. Petit. 1964. Some Neogene Mollusca from Florida and the Carolinas. Bulletins of American Paleontology 47(217):509-575
 J. R. Hendricks. 2008. The genus Conus (Mollusca: Neogastropoda) in the Plio-Pleistocene of the Southeastern United States. Bulletins of American Paleontology 375:1-178

External links 
 
 
 
 
 
?

adversarius
Prehistoric gastropods
Gastropods described in 1840